The 1965–66 European Cup was the first edition of the European Cup, IIHF's premier European club ice hockey tournament. The season started on October 23, 1965, and finished on March 18, 1966, at Brno, Czechoslovakia.

The tournament was won by ZKL Brno, who beat EV Füssen in the final

First round

 ZKL Brno,   
 EV Füssen:  bye

Quarterfinals

Semifinals

Finals

Top Goalscorer
Karel Skopal (ZKL Brno), 11

References 
 Season 1966

1965–66 in European ice hockey
1966